Tashi Dor is a peninsula protruding into  Namtso Lake from its south-eastern corner, in the Tibetan Region of China.

On the peninsula is a small monastery and several hermit caves. Nomadic herders frequently camp on the peninsula, and many species of migratory birds make their home there.  The 2005 completion of a paved road linking Tashi Dor with Lhasa, to the south, has facilitated the rapid expansion of tourist-oriented facilities on the peninsula.

Landforms of Tibet
Peninsulas of China